The slender broad-nosed bat (Platyrrhinus angustirostris) is a species of bat in the family Phyllostomidae. As a phyllostomid bat, it is characterized by a narrow uropatagium which is fringed with hair; a white dorsal stripe; large inner upper incisors convergent at the tips; and three upper and three lower molars. It is found in eastern Colombia and Ecuador, north-eastern Peru, and Venezuela. It is closely related to Platyrrhinus incarum and Platyrrhinus fusciventris.

References

Further reading
Velazco, PAÚL M., and BURTON K. Lim. "A new species of broad-nosed bat Platyrrhinus Saussure, 1860 (Chiroptera: Phyllostomidae) from the Guianan Shield." Zootaxa 3796.1 (2014): 175–193.
Albuja Viteri, Luis Humberto. "Lista de mamíferos actuales del Ecuador." (2011).
Ramírez-Chaves, Héctor E., Elkin A. Noguera-Urbano, and Miguel E. Rodríguez-Posada. "Mamíferos (Mammalia) del departamento de Putumayo, Colombia." Revista de la Academia Colombiana de Ciencias Exactas, Físicas y Naturales 37.143 (2013): 263–286.

Platyrrhinus
Mammals described in 2010
Bats of South America